Boevange-sur-Attert (literally Boevange on Attert;) is a small town in central Luxembourg, in the canton of Mersch. It is situated on the river Attert.

Until 31 December 2017, it was a commune. On 1 January 2018, the commune was merged with Tuntange to form the new commune of Helperknapp.

Former commune
The former commune consisted of the villages:

 Bill
 Boevange-sur-Attert
 Brouch
 Buschdorf
 Grevenknapp
 Fënsterdall
 Openthalt
 Brichermillen (lieu-dit)
 Fënsterdallerhéicht (lieu-dit)
 Helperknapp (lieu-dit)

References

External links
 

Former communes of Luxembourg
Towns in Luxembourg